Deewangee is a 2002 Indian Hindi-language psychological thriller film directed by Anees Bazmee and produced by Nitin Manmohan. The film stars Ajay Devgn, Akshaye Khanna and Urmila Matondkar. The music was composed by Ismail Darbar, with lyrics by Salim Bijnori and Nusrat Badr. This was Devgn's first antagonist role and he won the Filmfare Best Villain Award.

It is an adaptation of Primal Fear (1996) by Gregory Hoblit which was based on William Diehl's novel of the same name. Released on the eve of Diwali the film was a commercial success.It was remade in Tamil as Kadhal Kirukkan in 2003.

Plot 

Raj Goyal (Akshaye Khanna), a young and successful criminal lawyer, famous for never having lost a case, is introduced to popular singer Sargam (Urmila Matondkar) by music magnate Ashwin Mehta (Vijayendra Ghatge). The following day, Ashwin is brutally murdered in his own house. The murderer, Tarang Bharadwaj (Ajay Devgn), who is Sargam's childhood friend and music mentor, is caught red-handed at the crime scene. He claims he is innocent and Sargam, who believes in Tarang's innocence, approaches Raj to defend him, which he accepts after meeting Tarang.

Realising him to have a mental illness, he hires a psychiatrist (Seema Biswas). To study his case. The psychiatrist finds out that Tarang has split personality disorder (Now Dissociative identity disorder) and his other personality goes by the name of Ranjeet.

Meanwhile, Raj and Sargam grow closer due to their frequent meetings and eventually fall in love.

Raj speaks to Ranjeet, who is a complete opposite of the innocent and simple Tarang, and he admits to killing Ashwin because, on the night of the party, Ashwin had tried to molest Sargam. Ranjeet sees Tarang as his younger brother who in turn considers Sargam his wife. Bringing his split personality in front of the court, Raj is able to win the case and free Tarang. But right after he is acquitted, Raj finds out that the split personality disorder was an act put up by Tarang to get out of jail. Tarang then tells him to stay away from Sargam. Raj tries to reopen the case in order to protect Sargam but fails, and Tarang is moved to the mental hospital for a few days for his treatment. Raj elongates his stay in the mental hospital by proving that he is still sick and needs more treatment. Tarang is able to wriggle out of Raj's attempt and is released. Raj appoints personal security for Sargam to ensure her safety, while Tarang relentlessly tries to reach her, during which he seriously injures Yana, Sargam's assistant.

Raj says that they can trap Tarang with Sargam performing a show and Tarang coming there. But Tarang successfully kidnaps Sargam and takes her to an old fort where he had booked a vehicle to go abroad. Sargam gives her location secretly to Raj. Sargam while trying to escape tells Tarang that she loves Raj to which Tarang responds saying that then he has to kill Raj. Soon Raj arrives and a fight ensues which ends with Sargam overpowering Tarang and pushing him into a nearby river.

The next morning the police are unsuccessful in finding his body.

The movie ends with Sargam and Raj enjoying a vacation and they hear someone sing one of Tarang's songs. Raj believes it cannot be Tarang and because the song is so popular, anyone who can sing it.

Cast 
Ajay Devgan as Tarang / Ranjeet Bharadwaj
 Akshaye Khanna as Raj Goyal
 Urmila Matondkar as Sargam
 Farida Jalal as Mrs. Goyal, Raj's mother.
Seema Biswas as the psychiatrist
Tiku Talsania as Ratan (Raj's uncle)
 Tannaz Irani as Yana (Sargam's friend and personal assistant)
 Rana Jung Bahadur as Inspector Rana
 Vijayendra Ghatge as Ashwin Mehta
 Nishigandha Wad as Mrs. Mehta
 Nirmal Pandey as Abhijeet Mehta
 Suresh Oberoi as Mr. Bhullar
 Suhasini Mulay as the judge

Awards 

Won

 Filmfare Best Villain Award – Ajay Devgn
 Star Screen Award Best Villain – Ajay Devgn
 Zee Cine Award Best Actor in a Negative Role – Ajay Devgn

Nominated

 Star Screen Award for Best Actor – Akshaye Khanna

Music 

The soundtrack of the film contains nine songs. The music is conducted by composer Ismail Darbar. According to the Indian trade website Box Office India, with around 12,00,000 units sold, this film's soundtrack album was the year's ninth highest-selling.

Reception 

Deewangee received mixed reviews from critics. Bollywood Hungama rated the film 2.5/5, stating, "In an enterprise that boasts of two powerful performers-Ajay and Akshaye, comparisons are inevitable. But, to be honest, it's difficult to gauge who's better. Ajay Devgan essays a complex role with utmost ease, alternating between a simpleton and the shrewd (as part of the split personality!). Akshaye Khanna enacts a suave character with terrific understanding, proving yet again that he's amongst the best in the business today. Urmila Matondkar makes her presence felt in a male-dominated film. Her performance towards the end is praiseworthy. Amongst character artistes, Seema Biswas, Suresh Oberoi and Tanaz Currim are adequate. On the whole, DEEWANGEE has a novel story with several poignant moments as its USP. A well-made film with a few loose ends nonetheless, it has much to offer as compared to the vendetta fares and mushy love stories being dished out in the garb of entertainment. At the box-office, the impressive cast and the aggressive promotion have resulted in tremendous hype for the film, which in turn should translate into good business, keeping its investors smiling."

See also 

 Plot twist

References

External links 

 

2000s Hindi-language films
2002 films
2002 psychological thriller films
Films about dissociative identity disorder
Films directed by Anees Bazmee
Films scored by Ismail Darbar
Indian crime drama films
Indian crime thriller films
Indian psychological thriller films
Indian thriller drama films
Films based on American thriller novels
Indian remakes of American films